The eighth and final series of Gladiators aired in the UK from 11 December 1999 to 1 January 2000.

Episodes

References

1999 British television seasons
2000 British television seasons
series eight